Thea Thorsen (born 15 March 1992) is a Norwegian former racing cyclist, who competed professionally for UCI Women's Team  between 2012 and 2018. She competed in the 2013 UCI women's time trial in Florence.

References

External links

1992 births
Living people
Norwegian female cyclists
Place of birth missing (living people)
21st-century Norwegian women